Barkla is a lunar impact crater that lies near the eastern limb of the Moon. It is located to the east of the prominent crater Langrenus, and was formerly designated Langrenus A before being renamed by the IAU in 1979. Due east of Barkla is Kapteyn, a formation only slightly larger with a similar size. Southwest of Barkla is the crater Lamé.

The rim of Barkla is very nearly circular, although it is slightly elongated to the northeast and southwest. The wall shows little appearance of erosion from subsequent impacts, and is not overlain by any craterlets of note. At the midpoint of the floor is a central peak, which joins a low ridge running to the south and northeast.

References

External links
 

Impact craters on the Moon